Denise Reddy (born September 14, 1970) is an American professional soccer coach and former player who is currently an assistant coach for Chelsea in the FA Women's Super League.

Reddy holds a UEFA Pro License and previously coached Sky Blue FC of the National Women's Soccer League. She has also served as an assistant coach to Jim Gabarra at Washington Spirit and as head coach of Linköpings FC and Vittsjö GIK in Sweden, B.93/HIK/Skjold in Denmark, and Jersey Sky Blue of the USL W-League. She played four years as a starter at Rutgers University and 11 years as a professional in Sweden.

Reddy is from Hazlet, New Jersey and graduated from Raritan High School.

Playing career

Rutgers University, 1988–1991
Reddy was a four-year starter for the Rutgers Scarlet Knights, from 1988 to 1991. During that span, the Scarlet Knights won two Eastern Collegiate Athletic Conference championship titles, and Reddy was named to the NSCAA All-America second team in 1991. During her collegiate career, she scored 5 goals and 9 assists in 81 appearances.

Reddy also played for the Rutgers women's basketball team from 1990 to 1993, including an appearance in the 1993 Atlantic 10 Championship. She received her bachelor's degree in exercise science and communications.

Sweden, 1995–2005
After college, Reddy joined Swedish side Umeå IK in 1995, then moved to Malmö DFF in 1996, where she played for 10 years. For seven of those seasons, from 1999 to 2005, Reddy was the team's captain. During Reddy's time on the team, Malmö DFF won the 1997 Swedish Cup, reached the semifinals of the 2003–04 UEFA Women's Cup, and appeared in the 2005 Mediterranean International Cup championship. During her career at Malmö DFF, she scored 35 goals in 336 appearances.

Coaching career

Youth and non-professional, 1989–2005
Reddy coached in the New Jersey Olympic Development Program (ODP) from 1989 to 1994, and served as an assistant coach at Cornell University in 1994. During her professional playing career, Reddy also coached or was an assistant trainer at Borger (1996–2001) and Procivitas (2004–2005) high school academies in Sweden.

New Jersey Wildcats, 2006–2007
Charlie Naimo, then head coach of holding USL W-League champions New Jersey Wildcats, hired Reddy as an assistant in April 2006, following her retirement as a professional player.

Jersey Sky Blue, 2007–2008
After the season, she was hired as the head coach of the W-League's Jersey Sky Blue, where she served until 2008. Jersey Sky Blue was chaired by Thomas Hofstetter, who would go on to form Sky Blue FC in 2009, and Reddy is credited as one of the club's founders and instrumental in the establishment of the Sky Blue Soccer School.

Chicago Red Stars, 2008–2010
Reddy joined the coaching staff of the Chicago Red Stars of Women's Professional Soccer in 2008 as an assistant, where she served until 2010.

Linköpings FC, 2011–2012
Reddy was hired by Linköpings FC of the Swedish Damallsvenskan in 2011 as an assistant, a year in which Linköpings reached the UEFA Women's Champions League quarterfinals. She became a co-head coach with Christian Anderson in 2012.

B.93/HIK/Skjold, 2012–2014
Reddy coached Danish side B.93/HIK/Skjold from 2012 to 2014.

Vittsjö GIK, 2015–2016
Reddy joined Swedish club Vittsjö GIK as head coach in January 2015, and remained with the team into 2016.

Washington Spirit, 2016–2017
In the National Women's Soccer League, former Sky Blue FC head coach Jim Gabarra took over as head coach of the Washington Spirit after the departure of Mark Parsons to Portland Thorns FC. Gabarra hired Reddy as a defensive assistant coach, where she served until November 2017. Reddy was also the Spirit's Maryland Developmental Academy director.

Sky Blue FC, 2017–2019
On November 15, 2017, Sky Blue FC named Reddy as their new head coach, succeeding Christy Holly, who resigned during the 2017 National Women's Soccer League season. Reddy was briefly the only woman as a head coach in the NWSL, between the departure of Laura Harvey from Seattle Reign FC at the start of November 2017 to November 27, when Laura Harvey was hired to manage Utah Royals FC and Vera Pauw was named head coach of the Houston Dash.

On June 28, 2019, Reddy was relieved of her head coaching duties.

Chelsea, 2020–present
Reddy joined Chelsea as assistant coach on August 19, 2020.

References

External links
 Washington Spirit assistant coach profile 
 Linköpings FC profile

1970 births
Living people
National Women's Soccer League coaches
NJ/NY Gotham FC coaches
People from Hazlet, New Jersey
Soccer players from New Jersey
Sportspeople from Monmouth County, New Jersey
American women's soccer coaches
American expatriate sportspeople in England
Expatriate sportspeople in Sweden
Women's association football defenders
Rutgers Scarlet Knights women's soccer players
Damallsvenskan players
American women's soccer players
FC Rosengård players
Washington Spirit non-playing staff